The Teatro Peruano Japonés is a theatre in Lima, Peru.  It is located at the headquarters of Japanese Peruvian Association, a nonprofit organization for Peruvians of Japanese origin.

References

buildings and structures in Lima
theatres in Peru